Purabi Basu (born 21 September 1949) is a Bangladeshi short-story writer, pharmacologist and activist. She won Anannya Literary Award in 2005 and Bangla Academy Literary Award in 2013. As of 2005, she has been working as a senior executive at Wyeth Pharmaceuticals, a drug company based in New York.

Education
Basu completed her bachelor's degree in pharmacy from the University of Dhaka. She moved to the United States in 1970. She then earned her master's degree in biochemistry from Woman's Medical College of Pennsylvania in 1972 and Ph.D. from University of Missouri in nutrition in 1976. She later worked as a postdoctoral fellow in pharmacology at the University of South Alabama.

Career
Basu worked as a director of the health, nutrition and population division at BRAC.

Works
 Radha Will Not Cook Today 
 Saleha's Desire

Personal life
Basu is married to Ekushey Padak and Bangla Academy Literary Award winning short-story writer Jyoti Prakash Dutta.

References

Living people
1949 births
People from Munshiganj District
University of Dhaka alumni
Woman's Medical College of Pennsylvania alumni
University of Missouri alumni
Bangladeshi women writers
Bangladeshi pharmacologists
Bangladeshi feminists
Bangladeshi women's rights activists
Bengali Hindus
Bangladeshi Hindus
Recipients of Bangla Academy Award
Place of birth missing (living people)